The Conmhaicne (Old Irish [ˈkˠʰɔnˠβ̃ɑkʲːnʲɛ])  were a people of early Ireland, perhaps related to the Laigin, who dispersed to various parts of Ireland. They settled in Connacht and Longford, giving their name to several Conmaicne territories. T. F. O'Rahilly's assertion the Conmaicne were non-Goidelic is not widely accepted.

Etymology
Their name originates from a mythical ancestor known as Conmac(c) (Old Irish [ˈkˠʰɔnˠβ̃ɑkˠː]), meaning "hound-son" (con, prefix form of n-stem cú hound; mac, son). Conmac(c) descended from Fergus mac Róich and Queen Medb of Connacht. However, Walsh stated "Conmac son of Fergus is a genealogical fiction". The word Conmaicne means "progeny of Conmac" (-ne, a progeny). The name in Old Irish spelling contains m (without a following h) and c (or more etymologically, cc), thus Conmac(c) and Conmaic(c)ne, but in Modern Irish spelling contains mh (with unetymological h as a sign of lenition) and single c, thus Conmhac and Conmhaicne).

Branches
Branches of the Conmaicne dispersed to various places.

Conmhaicne na Gaillimhe
 Conmhaicne Mara (Conmaicne of the sea) settled in the west of County Galway, in the territory of Conmhaicne Mara, anglised today as Connemara.
 Conmhaicne Dúna Móir, or Conmaicne Cenel Dubáin, at Dunmore, County Galway.
 Conmhaicne Mhean or Conmaicne Máenmaige (Conmaicne of the central plain), Loughrea, County Galway.

Conmhaicne Mhaigh Eo
 Conmhaicne Cúile, of Kilmaine, County Mayo
 Conmhaicne Ceara, of Carra, County Mayo.
 Conmaicne Meic Oirbsen Máir near Lough Corrib, County Mayo

Conmhaicne Ros Comáin
 Conmhaicne Sléibe Formaile, near Ballinlough, in west County Roscommon.

Conmhaicne Rein
 Conmhaicne Rein, or "lower conmaicne", of south County Leitrim into County Longford.
 Conmhaicne Angaile, or "upper Conmaicne", now county Longford.

The Diocese of Ardagh was established in 1111 as the see for east Connacht. Fourteen years later, at the Synod of Kells-Mellifont, its area was reduced to the territory of the Conmaicne Rein and Conmaicne Angalie, south county Leitrim and all county Longford. The diocese was commonly called "the Diocese of the Conmaicne".

Septs
Known Septs of the Conmhaicne Rein in south County Leitrim were:
 Conmhaicne Maigh Rein anglicised today as barony of Mohill.
 Cluain Conmhaicne (Conmaicne of the pasture) of Cloone parish, in Carrigallen and Mohill barony. 
 Conmaicne Cenél Luacháin (Conmaicne descended from Luchan), both Oughteragh and Drumreilly parishes at Carrigallen, County Leitrim.
 Conmaicne Maigh Nissi along the Shannon, anglicised today as barony of Leitrim.

People
John O'Donovan wrote:

The chief families of the Conmacians were the O'Fearralls, princes and lords of Annaly, or Longford; the Mac Rannalls, a name anglicised to Reynolds, who were Lords of Conmaincee of Moy-Rein and Muintir-Eolais, in Leitrim; the Mac Keoghes, who were chiefs in Galway, and also in Lenister; the MacShanleys; O'Rodaghans; MacDorchys; O'Mulveys; O'Morans, and O'Mannings, chiefs and clans in various parts of Longford, Leitrim, and Roscommon.

Notables descended from the Conmhaicne include Cruimthear Mac Carthaigh, St. Jarlath of Tuam and some abbots of Clonmacnoise.

See also
 Delbhna
 Cíarraige

References 

 Some Connacht Population-Groups, Nollaig Ó Muraíle, in Seanchas:Studies in Early and Medieval Archaeology, History and Literature in Honour of Francis John Byrne, pp. 176–76, Four Courts Press, Dublin, 2000
 Medieval Ireland: Territorial, Political and Economic Divisions, Paul Mac Cotter, Four Courts Press, 2008, pp. 134–135.

Secondary sources

Medieval Irish people
Ulaid
History of County Galway
History of County Mayo
History of County Roscommon
History of County Leitrim
History of County Longford
Conmaicne